Valby-Hallen is a multi-purpose indoor arena located in Copenhagen, Denmark.

The venue is primarily used for sports and concerts. It has a capacity of 5,000 people.

Musicians like Bee Gees, ZZ Top, Iron Maiden, Phil Collins, Smashing Pumpkins, Ace of Base, Oasis, Coldplay, Depeche Mode, Radiohead, Pet Shop Boys and Little Mix have performed in Valby Hallen.

References

External links
Valby Hallen website

1984 establishments in Denmark
Sports venues completed in 1984
Event venues established in 1984
Music venues in Copenhagen
Sports venues in Copenhagen